Pella is a city in Marion County, Iowa, United States, with a population of 10,464 at the time of the 2020 U.S. Census. Founded by immigrants from the Netherlands, it is forty miles southeast of Des Moines. Pella is the home of Central College, as well as several manufacturing companies, including Pella Corporation and Vermeer Manufacturing Company.

History 
In 1847, 800 Dutch immigrants led by Dominee (Minister) Hendrik "Henry" P. Scholte settled the area known as Pella. The name "Pella" is a reference to Pella of the Decapolis, where the Christians of Jerusalem had found refuge during the Roman–Jewish war of 70; the name was selected because the Dominee and his followers sought religious freedom as well. Pella was the childhood home of Wyatt Earp, whose father Nicholas Porter Earp had settled on a farm near Pella. His brothers Warren and Morgan were born in Pella.

On July 19, 2018, a destructive EF3 tornado struck the Vermeer manufacturing plant in the city. Due to early warning, only 7 of the thousands of people on-site were injured.

Geography 
Since 2013, it is located in Iowa's 2nd congressional district. Before that year, it was part of Iowa's 3rd congressional district.

Demographics

2010 census
As of the census of 2010, 10,352 people, 3,735 households, and 2,500 families resided in the city. The 4,086 housing units averaged . The racial makeup of the city was 95.0% White, 0.7% African American, 0.2% Native American, 2.3% Asian, 0.3% from other races, and 1.4% from two or more races. Hispanics of any race were 1.7% of the population.

Of the 3,735 households, 30.0% had children under the age of 18 living with them, 58.6% were married couples living together, 6.5% had a female householder with no husband present, 1.9% had a male householder with no wife present, and 33.1% were not families. About 29.5% of all households were made up of individuals, and 13.4% had someone living alone who was 65 years of age or older. The average household size was 2.40 and the average family size was 2.96.

The median age in the city was 33.3 years. About 22.3% of residents were under the age of 18; 18.4% were between the ages of 18 and 24; 21.1% were from 25 to 44; 21.8% were from 45 to 64; and 16.4% were 65 years of age or older. The gender makeup of the city was 47.7% male and 52.3% female.

2000 census
As of the census of 2000, 9,832 people, 3,497 households, and 2,395 families resided in the city.

The median income for a household in the city was $45,496, and for a family was $56,321. Males had a median income of $40,344 versus $25,833 for females. The per capita income for the city was $19,674. About 3.2% of families and 7.7% of the population were below the poverty line, including 7.9% of those under age 18 and 13.9% of those age 65 or over.

Arts and culture 

Pella is home to a number of local events and architectural sites.

The Vermeer Mill grinds wheat into flour using only wind power and is the tallest working windmill in the United States.

The Pella Opera House, built in 1900, was renovated in 1990 and is a popular entertainment destination, featuring stained-glass windows and ornate tin ceilings. A canal winds through nearby Molengracht Plaza, home to shops, restaurants, a hostelry, a movie theatre, and a full-size working drawbridge.  On June 28, 2011, Sarah Palin visited the opera house for the premiere of The Undefeated, a documentary about her role in Alaska politics and rise to national attention.

The annual Tulip Time Festival is a celebration of Pella's Dutch heritage. It features tulip gardens, performances, crafters, music, food, Dutch costumes, and daily parades. The festival is held for three days (Thursday, Friday, and Saturday) during the first weekend in May. A queen and court are selected from the two high schools in the town to represent Pella and advertise the Festival. During the 2010 Festival, a world record was set for the most people dancing in wooden shoes. Over 2,600 people danced for more than six minutes to set the new standard.

Pella Dutch is a Dutch dialect spoken in Pella based on South Guelderish dialect.

Education 
The Pella Community School District operates local public schools.

Pella Christian Grade School(Pre-K through 8) and Pella Christian High School (9-12) serve students in Pella and the surrounding areas. 

In April 2011, Forbes rated Pella as third on its list of "The Best Schools For Your Real Estate Buck." Central College is located in Pella.

Parks and recreation 
A few miles to the west is Lake Red Rock, Iowa's largest reservoir, a popular destination for biking, hiking, boating, and fishing. The Bos Landen golf club is also in the town. The Pella Tulip Festival is held annually, honoring Pella's Dutch heritage.

Notable people

Bert Bandstra, served one term as a Democratic U.S. Representative
Rachel Brand, United States Associate Attorney General under President Trump
Kory DeHaan, former Major League Baseball player
 Sons of Nicholas Porter Earp:
Morgan Earp, lawman, born in Pella
Virgil Earp, lawman, deputy U.S. Marshal
Wyatt Earp, lawman and gunfighter of OK Corral fame, spent most of his childhood in Pella
Warren Earp, youngest of Earp brothers, born in Pella
Paul Emerick, professional rugby player, 2006 MVP
John Hospers, academician and the first Libertarian presidential candidate in 1972
Dave Keuning, guitarist for The Killers
Kyle Korver, former professional basketball player who currently serves as the Assistant General Manager for the Atlanta Hawks of the National Basketball Association (NBA).
Louis LeCocq, Pella native, World War I-era auto racer, killed in 1919 Indianapolis 500
Wendell L. Roelofs, scientist
Ron Schipper, football coach, member of the College Football Hall of Fame
Andy Thompson, Ohio state representative, born in Pella

See also
  
 Dutch letter – a pastry first introduced to the United States in Pella

References

External links 

City website

 
Dutch-American culture in Iowa
Populated places established in 1847
Cities in Iowa
Cities in Marion County, Iowa
Micropolitan areas of Iowa
1847 establishments in Iowa